Sittersdorf is a town in the district of Völkermarkt in Carinthia in south-central Austria.

Geography
Sittersdorf lies about 10 km as the crow flies from the Slovenian border. The Vellach and the Suchabach flow through it. The largest bodies of water in the municipality are the Gösselsdorfer See and the Sonnegger Reservoir.

Population
According to the 2001 census, 19.8% of the population were Carinthian Slovenes.

Gallery

References

External links 

 www.sittersdorf.at - town website

Cities and towns in Völkermarkt District